The Society for the Study of Medieval Languages and Literature (SSMLL) is a learned society that supports scholarly research and publication on the culture of the Middle Ages. It is best known for publishing the international academic journal Medium Ævum.

Activities 
The society was founded at the Taylor Institution of the University of Oxford on 15 February 1932. It evolved from the Arthurian Society of Oxford, which initiated the journal Arthuriana.

The primary focus of the society is on its journal, which has run continuously since 1932 alongside a series of monographs. Since its foundation, its membership has also sponsored research bursaries, conferences, and an annual Medium Ævum Essay Prize.

The society is a registered charity in the United Kingdom. HMRC recognizes it as an approved professional organization.

References

External links 
 Official website
 Society for the Study of Medieval Languages and Literature on JSTOR
 Medium Ævum on Archive.org

1932 establishments in the United Kingdom
Organisations associated with the University of Oxford
Learned societies of the United Kingdom
Book publishing companies of the United Kingdom
Medieval literature